John Cranwell (died 1793) was an English poet and cleric.

Cranwell studied at Sidney Sussex College, Cambridge (BA, 1747; MA, 1751). Having taken orders, he was elected to a fellowship by his college, and received the living of Abbotts Ripton, Huntingdonshire, which he held for twenty-six years. He died on 17 April 1793.

Cranwell translated two Latin poems in the heroic couplet, Isaac Hawkins Brown's De animi immortalitate (A Poem on the Immortality of the Soul, 1765), and Marcus Hieronymus Vida's Christiad (1768).

References 

 

Date of birth missing
1793 deaths
Alumni of Sidney Sussex College, Cambridge
Fellows of Sidney Sussex College, Cambridge
18th-century English Anglican priests
English translators
English poets